Teledyne LeCroy is an American manufacturer of oscilloscopes, protocol analyzers and other test equipment. LeCroy is now a subsidiary of Teledyne Technologies.

History 
LeCroy Corporation was founded in 1964 (as LeCroy Research Systems) by Walter LeCroy.

The company was privately held until its public offering in 1995.

In September 2004, LeCroy purchased Computer Access Technology Corporation (CATC).

On May 29, 2012, Teledyne Technologies Incorporated and LeCroy Corporation jointly announced that they had entered into a definitive agreement of the acquisition of LeCroy Corporation by Teledyne and the formation of Teledyne LeCroy as a wholly owned subsidiary.

On April 7, 2016, Teledyne LeCroy announced it had acquired Frontline Test Equipment, Inc., a provider of wireless protocol analysis test tools.

On April 13, 2016, Teledyne LeCroy announced it had entered into an agreement to acquire Quantum Data, Inc., a manufacturer of video test tools, signal generators, and protocol analyzers.

References

External links 
 

Manufacturing companies based in New York (state)
Electronics companies of the United States
Electronic test equipment manufacturers
Instrument-making corporations
Technology companies established in 1964
1995 initial public offerings